Failsworth tram stop is a Manchester Metrolink tram stop on the Oldham and Rochdale Line in Failsworth, Greater Manchester. It was formerly a railway station before its conversion to Metrolink in 2012.

History
Failsworth railway station opened on 26 April 1881 and was situated in Failsworth, in the Metropolitan Borough of Oldham, Greater Manchester, England. It was notable for its wooden platforms.

The station closed on 3 October 2009 to enable the line to be converted to a Metrolink service. It was rebuilt  and reopened as Failsworth tram stop on 13 June 2012.

On 6 February 2013, a pedestrian died after a collision with a tram at the stop.

Service pattern 

Connecting bus routes
Failsworth station is served by two direct bus service but several services also stop nearby. Stotts Tours route 151 runs northbound to Hollinwood via New Moston and southbound to Hightown via Newton Heath, Harpurhey and Cheetham Hill. Stotts Tours route 159 also stops outside and runs northbound to Middleton via New Moston and southbound to Oldham via Woodhouses, Hollinwood and Chadderton.

On Oldham Road, First Greater Manchester routes 83, 180 and 184 provide frequent and direct buses between Manchester and Oldham with the 83 continuing to Sholver and the 180/184 running to Saddleworth plus Huddersfield (184).

References

External links

Metrolink stop information
Failsworth area map

Tram stops in the Metropolitan Borough of Oldham
Former Lancashire and Yorkshire Railway stations
Railway stations in Great Britain opened in 1881
Railway stations in Great Britain closed in 2009
Railway stations in Great Britain opened in 2012
Tram stops on the East Didsbury to Rochdale line
1881 establishments in England
Failsworth